Westminster St George's, originally named St George's, Hanover Square, was a parliamentary constituency in Central London.  It returned one Member of Parliament (MP) to the House of Commons of the Parliament of the United Kingdom, elected by the first past the post system of election.

History
The constituency was created under the Redistribution of Seats Act 1885, and was then named "St George Hanover Square" after the parish of the same name.

It was renamed in 1918 as "Westminster St George's", and abolished in 1950.

Boundaries

1885–1918
From 1885 to 1918, when the constituency was known as St George Hanover Square, it was defined as being coterminous with the civil parish of the same name. In 1900 the parish was included for local government purposes in the area of the Metropolitan Borough of Westminster. This did not affect the name or boundaries of the constituency until 1918.

1918–1950
The Boundary Commission report of 1918 (Cd. 8756), at Schedule-Part II no. 78, defined the constituency as the following wards of the Metropolitan Borough of Westminster:

 Conduit: A small ward running from the top of Regent Street down through Hanover Square, the eastern side of Berkeley Square, and down to the Ritz on Piccadilly.
 Grosvenor: Covering the whole of Mayfair and the northern half of Hyde Park.
 Hamlet of Knightsbridge: The southern half of Hyde Park, together with Knightsbridge and part of the museums area north of South Kensington including the Royal Albert Hall.
 Knightsbridge St. George's: The area of Belgravia.
 Victoria: A very large ward running from Buckingham Palace south to include Victoria Station, and Pimlico.

The constituency also included "the part of the Charing Cross Ward which lies to the south and west of a line drawn from the ward boundary at the centre of Wellington Arch, along the middle of Constitution Hill, thence along the middle of the road to the north and east of the Queen Victoria Memorial, thence along the middle of Spur Road to boundary of St. Margaret Ward". This area included the remainder of the grounds of Buckingham Palace which were not in the Victoria Ward, but contained no electors. The boundary commissioners proposals were enacted by Schedule 9 of the Representation of the People Act 1918.

Members of Parliament

Elections

Elections in the 1880s

Percy's resignation caused a by-election.

Elections in the 1890s

Goschen was appointed First Lord of the Admiralty, requiring a by-election.

Elections in the 1900s

Elections in the 1910s

Elections in the 1920s

Elections in the 1930s

Elections in the 1940s

References

F. W. S. Craig, British Parliamentary Election Results 1885 – 1918
F. W. S. Craig, British Parliamentary Election Results 1918 – 1949

Parliamentary constituencies in London (historic)
Constituencies of the Parliament of the United Kingdom established in 1885
Constituencies of the Parliament of the United Kingdom disestablished in 1950
Politics of the City of Westminster